The Ighiu is a left tributary of the river Ampoi in Romania. It discharges into the Ampoi in Șard.

References

Rivers of Romania
Rivers of Alba County